The Land Run of 1892 was the opening of the Cheyenne-Arapaho Reservation to settlement in the U.S. state of Oklahoma. One of seven in Oklahoma, it occurred on April 19, 1892, and opened up land that would become Blaine, Custer, Dewey, Washita, and Roger Mills counties. The land run also opened up what would become part of Ellis County, but was designated County "E" and then Day County prior to statehood.

Background
The Creek and Seminole were originally relocated to the area in the 1820s and 1830s, but Reconstruction Treaties of 1866 took the land away from both tribes. The Cheyenne and Arapaho were moved to the area from Colorado in 1869.

The  of the Cheyenne and Arapaho Reservation were opened by a proclamation from U.S. President Benjamin Harrison on April 12, 1892. The reservation had become a part of the federal public domain after allotment of  plots to individual Indians.

Settlers and developments
A diverse group gathered for the land run. It included Kansans, Texans, Missourians, Oklahomans, African-Americans, Swedes, Bohemians, Germans, and Russians. According to Kiowa chief Big Tree, there were "as many [people] as the blades of grass on the Washita in the spring." Settlers claimed more than 400 lots in what would become Arapaho, the county seat of Custer County. The region became cattle country, due to both its geography and the tenacious efforts of cattlemen, who often harassed farmers on the land.

See also
 Land run
 Land Run of 1889
 Land Run of 1891
 Land Run of 1893
 Land Run of 1895

References

History of United States expansionism
Pre-statehood history of Oklahoma
April 1892 events
1892 in Oklahoma Territory